Lempuyangan Station (LPN) is a railway station located in Bausasran, Danurejan, Yogyakarta, Indonesia. The station is part of Operational Area VI Yogyakarta. It has 11 lines, including two straight tracks.

Opened on 2 March 1872, Lempuyangan Station is used for passengers and local freight. The station has signage with travel information: train capacity and route details, such as the distance between stations. A screen displays train arrivals and departures, similar to an airport.

Services

Intercity trains 
Mixed class
 Gaya Baru Malam Selatan to  via - and  via -- (executive-economy plus)
 Singasari to  via - and  via - (executive-economy plus)

Economy Plus class

 Jaka Tingkir to  via - and 
 Bogowonto to  via -
 Gajah Wong to  via -

Economy class

 Pasundan to  via  and  via --
 Kahuripan to  via Tasikmalaya and  via -
 Bengawan to  via - and 
 Progo to Pasar Senen via Purwokerto-Cirebon Prujakan
 Sri Tanjung to  via ---

Commuter rail 

Bus connection 
There are a number of Trans Jogja bus stops nearby the station. The Stasiun Lempuyangan bus stop serves Line 10. Another bus stop is Lempuyangan, which serves Line 4A and 4B alongside Line 10.

See also
List of railway stations in Indonesia
Rail transport in Indonesia

References

External links 

 Ground transport from the station

 Buildings and structures in Yogyakarta
 Railway stations in Yogyakarta